The 2012 FIFA Futsal World Cup qualification for CAF was the qualifiers for Africa to determine the three teams who qualified for the 2012 FIFA Futsal World Cup.

First round
Dates: 6–8 April and 20–22 April 2012

Winners advances to the second round.
Note: Guinea withdrew from the competition.
Note: Sudan requested to CAF to play only one game due to the lack of suitable indoor facilities in the country.

Second round
Dates: 4–6 May and 18–20 May 2012

Winners advances to the third round.
Note: Cameroon, Gabon and Guinea-Bissau withdrew from the competition.

Third round
The six winners from the second round will face off in a home and away format for Africa's three slots at the 2012 FIFA Futsal World Cup in Thailand.

Dates: 8–10 June and 22–24 June 2012

Qualified nations

References

External links
 Schedule and Results
 FIFA.com

Qualification, 2012 Fifa Futsal World Cup